Kilikia Football Club, is a defunct Armenian football club from the capital Yerevan.

History

Beginning
Kilikia F.C. was founded in 1992 and participated in the first ever independent Armenian championship. In 1992, they occupied the 12th spot in the table, and were allowed to play in the 1993 Armenian Premier League. At the beginning of 1993, the club merged with fellow financially struggling FC Malatia. The merger lasted only for 1 year, as the team was relegated to the Armenian First League. In the beginning of 1994 the two clubs were separated and disbanded.

Revival in 1997
Kilikia F.C. was revived in 1997, but did not participate in the league until year 1999. In 1999, Kilikia F.C. had replaced the financially struggling club Pyunik Yerevan in the Premier League. In 2001 Kilikia F.C. was relegated from the Armenian Premier League after refusing to pay the entrance fee. They got promoted again in 2003, and have since then finished sixth and fifth in the Premier League, with the fifth-place in 2005 earning them entry into the 2006 Intertoto Cup.
The club has since been struggling to keep up with the other clubs, as it only manages to field young local players.

Later years and dissolution
In 2011, the club management had to confirm the participation of Kilikia F.C. in the national championship of 2011 and make appropriate contributions to January 16. But no confirmation and payment is not made within the specified period. On January 26 the club sent an official letter in the Armenian Football Federation, saying that the team is disbanded and will not be able to participate in the championship of Armenia in 2011 because of financial problems. On January 31 FFA officially decided to exclude "Kilikia" from all football tournaments under the auspices of the FFA. Thus, the club ceased to exist.

Achievements
Armenian Cup
 Runner-up (1) – 2005

Kilikia F.C. in European cups
As of December, 2008.

Home results are noted in bold

References

External links
 Kilikia at FFA.AM
 Kilikia at UEFA.COM
With the website UEFA
Appearances in UEFA Champions League:  1 (In the article about the team – information not available)
Appearances in UEFA Europa League:  1  (In the article about the team – information not available)
Appearances in UEFA Intertoto Cup:  1
 Kilikia at EUFO.DE
 Kilikia at Weltfussball.de

Kilikia FC
Association football clubs established in 1992
Association football clubs disestablished in 2011
 
Kilikia
Kilikia
1992 establishments in Armenia
2011 disestablishments in Armenia